Pueblo Nuevo District is one of the fourteen districts of the Ica Province in Peru.

Districts of the Ica Region
1871 establishments in Peru